Union Grounds, also known as Union Base Ball Park, was a baseball grounds in St. Louis, Missouri. It was home to the St. Louis Maroons of the Union Association during the 1884 season and the Maroons entry in the National League in 1885 and 1886.

Both the Union Association and the St. Louis Maroons were the brainchild of Henry Lucas, and local newspapers often called the venue "the Lucas Park" or just "Lucas Park".

The ballpark was bounded by Jefferson Avenue (west, first base); Howard Street (north, third base); 25th Street (east, left field); and Cass Avenue (south, right field). Mullanphy Street now cuts through what was once right and center fields.

References 
Retrosheet. "Park Directory". Retrieved 2008-05-23.
 Stadium information

Sports venues in St. Louis
Tourist attractions in St. Louis
Defunct sports venues in Missouri 
Defunct baseball venues in the United States
Former buildings and structures in St. Louis